Greg Knowles (born 10 September 1963) is a New Zealand sailor. He competed at the 1988 Summer Olympics and the 1992 Summer Olympics.

References

External links
 

1963 births
Living people
New Zealand male sailors (sport)
Olympic sailors of New Zealand
Sailors at the 1988 Summer Olympics – Flying Dutchman
Sailors at the 1992 Summer Olympics – Flying Dutchman
Sportspeople from Auckland